Fox Pop is a 1942 Warner Bros. Merrie Melodies color cartoon short supervised by Chuck Jones. The short was released on September 5, 1942.

Plot

A man is relaxing inside his cabin, listening to his radio; outside, a red fox is on the prowl. With apparent sinister intent, the animal creeps to the door then springs into the house, but rather than attack the man, he steals the radio. At a distance from the house, the fox pulls out an ax and starts destroying the radio. Two crows on a tree branch above are confused, and one asks, "What's bitin' you anyhow?"  The fox begins telling them, via flashbacks:

While scrounging for food in trash cans outside the same cabin, the fox overhears an announcer on the radio saying that foxes are in style this year for well-dressed ladies.  Badly misinterpreting this message, the fox pictures himself as the pampered pet of a wealthy, adoring owner, and rushes to the Sterling Silver Fox Farm (named in the advertisement) to put himself up for adoption.

At the farm, the fox inserts the tip of his tail into a fox trap, but the trapper points out that the trap is for silver foxes only, and kicks the fox into a nearby garbage heap.  The fox scrounges a can of silver paint and coats himself with it, repeating the ruse and this time getting himself eagerly scooped up by the trapper.

Inside the farm, the faux silver fox is told by an actual silver fox in the cage next to his that they are escaping that night.  The painted fox laughs and says he is quite happy to stay, and the silver fox states that he will be joining their break-out, "or else..." and runs his finger across his throat.  Again, the painted fox badly misinterprets this as meaning the silver fox is threatening to kill him if he does not go along.  Nervous and looking for an excuse to stay, he points out that his cage is locked and there is no key.  For answer, the silver fox bites down hard on the nail file he has been holding, creating a perfect copy of the trapper's cage key.

 At nine o'clock, the silver foxes escape.  The painted fox feigns joy at being set free, but deliberately falls back, re-enters his cage and re-locks the door. Now alone, he notices a tag attached to his cage, reading, "This skin reserved for 'Silver Fox Cape for Mrs. Van Dough'''".  He finally understands that what the radio advertisement was promoting was not live fox pets, but rather coats made from their dead pelts.  Hearing a grinding noise, he looks through the bars of his cage and sees the trapper sharpening his ax, realizes the true meaning of the silver fox's throat-cutting gesture, and is thrown into a panic.

As the trapper heads towards the painted fox's cage, ax in hand, the fox grabs the silver fox's dropped key, unlocks his cage and flees into the woods.  Angered, the trapper sends his hunting dogs after him.  After a long chase, the painted fox jumps into a lake, makes his way to the other side, and notices the silver paint has washed away.  Believing this to be his ticket to safety, he stops the dogs and informs them he is not and never was a silver fox, and therefore it should not be necessary to chase him any longer. The dogs respond, "Silver Shmilver... as long as you're a fox!" and proceed to beat him up.

The flashback ends and the fox ends his story with "And that's what's bitin' me. That's what!" In a show of support, the crows drop down and finish destroying the radio.

Release

"Fox Pop" was released on September 5, 1942. It was later reissued as a Blue Ribbon release on September 28, 1946. It has since been made available to the public domain after years of copyright neglect.

Home media
Though Fox Pop'' has yet to make its way onto any official Looney Tunes / Merrie Melodies Collection DVDs and Blu-rays, the short was released on The Golden Age of Looney Tunes Volume 4 LaserDisc, released on July 14, 1993.

References

External links

1942 films
1942 animated films
1942 short films
Animated films about animals
Animated films about foxes
Films scored by Carl Stalling
Short films directed by Chuck Jones
Merrie Melodies short films
1940s Warner Bros. animated short films